Ian Ewart Raby (22 September 1921 in Woolwich, London – 7 November 1967 in Lambeth) was a British racing driver from England.  He participated in 7 World Championship Formula One Grands Prix, debuting on 20 July 1963 in the British Grand Prix, where he retired on Lap 60. He scored no championship points. He was a garage-owner in Brighton, Sussex trading as Empire Cars Ltd. As a privateer he came to Formula One late in life.

Raby started racing about 1953 and drove an assortment of cars, many with the name "puddle jumper" written on the side. He is remembered for the I.E.R. Midget F3 car of 1954. He won the 500 c.c. racing car class in a Cooper at the Brighton Speed Trials in 1955. Raby finished 15th in the 1957 24 Hours of Le Mans, sharing a Cooper-Climax T39 with Jack Brabham. He won the first Formula Junior race to be held in Britain, at Brands Hatch on 3 August 1959 driving the one-off Moorland car. On 12 June 1960 he won a heat and finished second overall in the Albi Grand Prix, France, for Formula Junior cars. Later that year he won a Formula Libre race at Mallory Park in a Cooper-Climax F2. On 9 May 1963 he took third place in the non-championship F1 Rome Grand Prix at Vallelunga in a Gilby-B.R.M. V8. At the Solitude Grand Prix he was still running at the end but not classified, and he retired in the Oulton Park Gold Cup.

He switched to a Brabham-B.R.M. for 1964 but the car often let him down, non-starting in the Italian Grand Prix at Monza. He managed an eighth at Syracuse in the Brabham in 1965, selling the car prior to the Italian Grand Prix that year.

As Formula One switched to 3-litres for 1966 Ian Raby opted to race in Formula Two. An F2 Brabham-Ford Lotus twin-cam for 1967 produced an eighth place at Snetterton on 24 March. Another eighth place at Hockenheim in June only highlighted the lack of a de rigueur Cosworth FVA engine. Back at Hockenheim on 9 July, Raby managed fifth place against his more powerful rivals.

On 30 July 1967, Ian Raby crashed his Brabham in the Zandvoort Trophy (Grote Prijs van Zandvoort) F2 race and was seriously injured. He succumbed to his injuries on 7 November 1967.

Complete Formula One World Championship results
(key)

Footnotes

References
 For the Moorland Formula Junior car see:

External links

Racing database
Ian Raby profile at The 500 Owners Association

1921 births
1967 deaths
Brighton Speed Trials people
English Formula One drivers
European Formula Two Championship drivers
Racing drivers who died while racing
Sport deaths in the Netherlands
24 Hours of Le Mans drivers
World Sportscar Championship drivers
Formula One team owners
Formula One team principals